Protein topology is a property of protein molecule that does not change under deformation (without cutting or breaking a bond).

Frameworks
Two main topology frameworks have been developed and applied to protein molecules.

Knot Theory
Knot theory which categorises chain entanglements. The usage of knot theory is limited to a small percentage of proteins as most of them are unknot.

Circuit topology
Circuit topology categorises intra-chain contacts based on their arrangements.

Other Uses
In biology literature, the term topology is also used to refer to mutual orientation of regular secondary structures, such as alpha-helices and beta strands in protein structure . For example, two adjacent interacting alpha-helices or beta-strands can go in the same or in opposite directions. Topology diagrams of different proteins with known three-dimensional structure are provided by PDBsum (an example).

See also
 Circuit topology
 Membrane topology
 Protein folding

References

External links
Pro-origami: Protein structure cartoons
TOPS services at Glasgow University
PTGL
TOPDRAW

Protein structure
Molecular topology